Olympic Nice Natation is a French water polo and swimming club from Nice, founded in 1989.

Its men's team won eight national championships in a row between 1997 and 2004, while its women's team has been successful in recent years, with four championships since 2007. Most recently the women's team played the 2012 European Cup.

Titles
 Men
 Championnat de France
 1997, 1998, 1999, 2000, 2001, 2002, 2003, 2004
 Coupe de France
 1999, 2000, 2001, 2002
 Coupe de la Ligue
 2003
 Women
 Championnat de France
 2007, 2009, 2010, 2011
 Coupe de France
 2010, 2011

References

Water polo clubs in France
Sport in Nice
LEN Women's Champions' Cup clubs